William of Bitton (died 1274) was a medieval Bishop of Bath and Wells.

Life

William was a son of Sir Adam of Bitton in Gloucestershire and the brother of Thomas Bitton who was precentor, archdeacon of Wells and Dean of Wells and Bishop of Exeter. His uncle was William of Bitton I, Bishop of Bath and Wells. He was rector of Buckland from 1257 and rector of Congresbury in Somerset from 1252. Before 13 December 1262 he was a canon of Bath and Wells, and was archdeacon of Wells as well as rector of Middlezoy in Somerset by 20 April 1263.

William was elected as bishop on 10 February 1267 and consecrated after 17 April 1267. He was not active in political or governmental events, although he did go to a council in 1269 that objected to ecclesiastical taxation. He, like his uncle, mainly worked in his diocese, and regulated the liturgical life of his cathedral and endowed the cathedral with some property.

William died 4 December 1274 and was buried in Bath Cathedral. Some veneration was given to him after his death, but no formal canonization ever occurred. He should not be confused with his uncle the first William of Bitton who was also Bishop of Bath and Wells, but who died in 1264.

Notes

Citations

References

 
 
 
 
 

Bishops of Bath and Wells
Archdeacons of Wells
1274 deaths
Year of birth unknown
People from Bitton
13th-century English Roman Catholic bishops